The Kanto Plains Association of Secondary School Principals (KPASSP) is an organization comprising the principals of various international schools in the Kanto region of Japan.

Members of the association include the principals of the following institutions:
 American School in Japan
 Aoba-Japan International School
 Christian Academy in Japan
 Kinnick High School / Yokosuka Middle School
 St. Mary's International School
 Saint Maur International School
 Seisen International School
 The British School in Tokyo
 International School of the Sacred Heart
 Yokohama International School
 Yokota High School
 Zama High School
 K. International School Tokyo
 Tokyo International School

Film Festival
In 2010, the Kanto Plain Festival makes its debut to KPASSP schools

Speech Festival
Each year KPASSP schools hold a Speech Festival in several categories:

Categories
Multiple-Reading
Original Informative
Storytelling
Dramatic Duo
Original Persuasive
Poetry Interpretation
Humorous
Extemporaneous Speaking  
Dramatic Interpretation

Festival Locations
2017(Fall): Seisen International School
2016(Fall): St. Maur International School
2014(Fall): St. Maur International School
2010(Fall): Seisen International School
2010(Spring): St. Mary's International School
2009: American School in Japan

Sports
American Football (ASIJ, Zama, Yokota, Kinnick only)
Cheerleading (ASIJ, Zama, Yokota, Kinnick only)
Baseball (ASIJ, SMIS, Zama, Yokota, Kinnick, YIS only)
Cross country
Tennis
Volleyball
Basketball
Wrestling
Soccer / Football
Field Hockey
Track & field
Soccer

Tokyo Area Honor Choir
"Every year, high school students from all over the Kanto Plain region compete to become members of the prestigious Tokyo International Honor Choir." 
Students accepted are required to practice singing in a specific school with the other international students in the Kanto Plains area.

Yearly Music Festivals
Fall HS Band and Orchestra
Vocal Solo and Ensemble
Instrumental Solo and Ensemble
HS Jazz Fest
HS Honor Band
HS Honor Orchestra
Spring HS Band and Orchestra
MS Band
MS Select Band
ES Choral
MS Choral
HS Choral

See also
Secondary education in Japan

References

External links
 American School in Japan
 Aoba-Japan International School
 Christian Academy in Japan
 St. Mary's International School
 Saint Maur International  School
 Seisen International School
 International School of the Sacred Heart
 Yokohama International School
 KPASSP News through Photography

Educational organizations based in Japan
+